Mian Rudan (also Romanized as Mīān Rūdān; also known as Mianrud) is a village in Palanga Rural District, Shahrud District, Khalkhal County, Ardabil Province, Iran. At the 2006 census, its population was 647, in 156 families.

References 

Towns and villages in Khalkhal County